Heißer Sommer, aka Hot Summer (USA), is a 1968 East German musical film. A 2001 video release promotes the film as "The East German Grease" although perhaps it is closer in concept to the 1963 British movie Summer Holiday which starred Cliff Richard.

Plot

A group of girls and a separate group of boys come across each other whilst travelling from Leipzig to Ruegen Island for the summer holidays. Initially trying to ignore and avoid each other, the two groups find themselves billeted close by, relaxing together, enjoying each other's company and the resulting relationships that develop. The movie deals with the conflicts of each relationship in the group by singing and dancing their way through each situation including a brief encounter with the VoPo's - the police. The majority of the film is shot on Ruegen Island which at the time, was a popular destination for East Germans and today is popular with travellers the world over. Included are some early footage of Leipzig and East Berlin during the reconstruction and re-building era of the former GDR.

Cast
Chris Doerk - Stupsi
Frank Schöbel - Kai
Regine Albrecht - Brit
Hanns-Michael Schmidt - Wolf
Georg-Peter Welzel - Schpack
Hans Mietzner - Schelle
Norbert Speer - Rechtsanwalt (Lawyer)
Gerd Nordheim - Tom
Ernst-Jürgen Thede - Transistor
Madeleine Lierck - Thalia
Rosa Lotze - Trude
Bruno Carstens - Meister Klaus
Werner Lierck - Abschnittsbevollmächtigter (Policeman)
Marianne Wünscher - VEG-Leiterin (Boss of Farm)
Erich Brauer - Fischer (Fisherman)
 Urta Bühler - Sybille
 Camilla Hempel - Röschen (Rose)
 Leonore Kaufmann - Mädchen (Girl)
 Ursula Soika - Bärbel
 Hella Ziesing - Mädchen (Girl)
 Sylvia von Kashiwoslozki - Mädchen (Girl)
 Marlis Räth - Himmlische (Heavenly)
 Angelika Schmidt - Himmlische (Heavenly)
 Günther Lisiecki - Junge (Boy)
 Peter Heiland - Junge (Boy)
 Hans-Christian Albers - Junge (Boy)

Soundtrack
 Heißer Sommer (03:20) (Chris Doerk & Frank Schöbel)
 Das Darf Nicht Wahr Sein (02:58) (Chris Doerk, Frank Schöbel, Regine Albrecht & Hanns-Michael Schmidt)
 Männer, Die Noch Keine Sind (02:40) (Chris Doerk)
 Wir (01:58) (Frank Schöbel)
 Tanz Am Strand (02:04) (Orchester Günter Gollasch)
 Woher Willst Du Wissen, Wer Ich Bin? (02:08) (Chris Doerk & Frank Schöbel)
 Was Erleben (02:38) (Chris Doerk)
 Ein Sommerlied (02:48) (Frank Schöbel)
 Fang Doch Den Sonnenstrahl (02:28) (Gerti Möller & Frank Schöbel)
 Ich Fand Die Eine (04:17) (Frank Schöbel)
 Es War Mal Ein Mädchen (01:45) (Ingo Graf)
 Einmal Muß Ein Ende Sein (02:40) (Frank Schöbel)
 Finale Heißer Sommer (01:32) (Chris Doerk & Frank Schöbel)

Reviews
 Heißer Sommer is featured in the 1997 documentary film East Side Story
 IMDb's link to external reviews can be found at: 
 A written review is located at Puchalski, Steven. Short Takes. In: Shock Cinema (New York City, New York, USA), Steven Puchalski, Vol. 19, 2001, Pg. 42, (MG)

During its original run, the film sold 3,441,595 tickets.

References

External links
 In 2009, a live musical production of the show was held in Berlin: Heisser Sommer Musical
 
 Various links for Heißer Sommer at IMDb

1968 films
1968 musical films
German musical films
East German films
Films set in the Baltic Sea
Films set on islands
1960s German films